Goddess of Liberty is a sculpture by Elijah E. Myers, installed atop the Texas State Capitol dome, in Austin, Texas, United States. The original statue was erected in February 1888. It was replaced by a replica on June 14, 1986, and the original was restored and relocated to the Bullock Texas State History Museum.

See also

 List of public art in Austin, Texas
 Statue of Freedom, an 1863 sculpture by Thomas Crawford atop the dome of the US Capitol
 Statue of Liberty (Liberty Enlightening the World), 1886 statue by Frédéric Auguste Bartholdi in New York City
Miss Freedom, a similar 1889 statue on the dome of the Georgia State Capitol (US)

References

External links
 

Finial figures
Liberty symbols
Outdoor sculptures in Austin, Texas
Sculptures of women in Texas
Statues in Austin, Texas